Sharqzadegi or Sharghzadegi (Persian: شرق‌زدگی) is a pejorative Persian term variously translated as "Eastoxification." It is used to refer to the loss of Iranian independence in the fields manufacturing, products and innovation due to the import of cheap Chinese alternatives. This has become especially pertinent in the early half the 21st century with the increase in Chinese automotive companies inside Iran.
Unlike "Westoxification", "Eastofixication" does not infer Iranians' interest in Oriental culture, however is in 2015 limited to the appropriation and rise of Chinese industry in Iran.   
Eastoxifiation first appearance in printed literature in the English languages dates back to 1984, where  Martin E. Marty Fundamentalisms and Society: Reclaiming the Sciences, the Family, and Education states that sharqhzadeqi is the act of appreciation of Eastern culture.

See also

Intellectual movements in Iran

References

Economy of Iran
Anti-Chinese sentiment in Asia
Persian words and phrases